The 2006–07 All-Ireland Senior Club Hurling Championship was the 37th club hurling competition since its establishment in 1970–71. The first matches of the season were played on 22 October 2006 and the championship ended on 17 March 2007. Portumna went into the 2006–07 championship as defending champions, having won their first All-Ireland title the previous year.

The championship culminated with the All-Ireland final, held at Croke Park, Dublin. The match was contested by Ballyhale Shamrocks and Loughrea.  It was their first meeting in the final.  Ballyhale won the game by 3–12 to 2–8.  It was their fourth All-Ireland title ever.

Format
The 2006–07 club championship was played on a straight knock-out basis.  Each of the twenty participating counties enter their respective club champions.  The format of the competition was as follows:

20 county club champions participated in the 2008–09 championship.  These counties were as follows:
 Leinster: Carlow, Dublin, Kilkenny, Laois, Offaly, Wexford.
 Munster: Clare, Cork, Kerry, Limerick, Tipperary, Waterford.
 Connacht: Galway, Leitrim, Mayo, Roscommon, Sligo
 Ulster: Antrim, Derry, Down.

Provincial Championships
The Connacht, Leinster, Munster and Ulster championships were played as usual on a straight knock-out basis. The four respective champions from these provinces advanced directly to the All-Ireland semi-finals.

All-Ireland Series
Semi-finals: (2 matches) The Munster champions played the Leinster champions while the Connacht champions played the Ulster champions.  The two winners contested the All-Ireland final.

Participating clubs

Results

Connacht Senior Club Hurling Championship

Leinster Senior Club Hurling Championship

Munster Senior Club Hurling Championship

Ulster Senior Club Hurling Championship

All-Ireland Senior Club Hurling Championship

Top scorers

Overall

Single game

2006 in hurling
2007 in hurling
All-Ireland Senior Club Hurling Championship